Samuel Bruce Perkins (born June 14, 1961) is an American former professional basketball player and executive. Perkins was a three-time college All-American, was a member of the 1982 national champion North Carolina Tar Heels, and won a gold medal with the 1984 United States men's Olympic basketball team. Perkins played professionally in the National Basketball Association (NBA) for 17 seasons.

High school career
Born in Brooklyn, New York, Perkins attended Samuel J. Tilden High School. He later attended and graduated from Shaker High School in Latham, New York. He was named large-school player of the year (high school) by the New York State Sportswriters Association in 1980 and was also named to the 35 Greatest Boys McDonald's All Americans team.

College career
Perkins attended college at the University of North Carolina and played basketball for the North Carolina Tar Heels from 1980 to 1984. He was named ACC Rookie of the Year in 1981 and starred alongside future NBA Hall of Famers James Worthy and Michael Jordan on the Tar Heels' 1982 NCAA championship team. A three-time All-American, Perkins was the 1984 USA Basketball Male Athlete of the Year. Perkins finished his collegiate basketball career as the Tar Heels' all-time leader in rebounds and blocked shots and as the second-highest scorer in team history. He graduated from UNC in 1984. Perkins was a co-captain of the gold medal-winning 1984 United States men's Olympic basketball team. He was named first-team All-Atlantic Coast Conference three times in his Tar Heel career.

Professional career
Chosen by the Dallas Mavericks as the fourth overall pick in the 1984 NBA draft, Perkins went on to play as a power forward and center in the NBA from 1984 to 2001. He was named to the NBA All-Rookie First Team in 1985. Perkins played for the Dallas Mavericks, Los Angeles Lakers, Seattle SuperSonics, and Indiana Pacers, respectively. He scored a career-high 45 points on April 12, 1990. Perkins tied an NBA record on January 15, 1997, by making eight three-pointers without a miss. He appeared in three NBA Finals: The 1991 NBA Finals (with the Lakers), the 1996 NBA Finals (with the SuperSonics), and the 2000 NBA Finals (with the Pacers). In game one of the 1991 NBA Finals, Perkins made a game-winning three-point shot to defeat the Chicago Bulls. He was known by the nicknames "Sleepy Sam", "Big Smooth", and "The Big Easy".

Post-retirement activities
In 2002, Perkins was named to the ACC 50th Anniversary men's basketball team as one of the fifty greatest players in Atlantic Coast Conference history.

In 2008, Perkins was named vice president of player relations for the Indiana Pacers. That September, he was inducted into the New York City Basketball Hall of Fame. Perkins held his position with the Pacers until 2010.

In 2011, Perkins traveled to South Sudan as a SportsUnited Sports Envoy for the U.S. Department of State. In this capacity, he worked with Dikembe Mutombo to lead a series of basketball clinics and team-building exercises with 50 youth and 36 coaches. This helped contribute to the State Department's mission to remove barriers and create a world in which individuals with disabilities enjoy dignity and full inclusion in society.

Perkins was named to the National Collegiate Basketball Hall of Fame in 2018.

Perkins runs a summer camp for Chapel Hill, North Carolina youth that focuses on developing the basic skills of basketball.

Personal life
Perkins was raised a Jehovah's Witness. During his professional career, he stood away from his line of teammates for the national anthem due to his faith.

NBA career statistics

Regular season 

|-
| style="text-align:left;"| 
| style="text-align:left;"| Dallas
| 82 || 42 || 28.3 || .471 || .250 || .820 || 7.4 || 1.6 || .8 || .8 || 11.0
|-
| style="text-align:left;"| 
| style="text-align:left;"| Dallas
| 80 || 79 || 32.8 || .503 || .333 || .814 || 8.6 || 1.9 || .9 || 1.2 || 15.4
|-
| style="text-align:left;"| 
| style="text-align:left;"| Dallas
| 80 || 80 || 33.6 || .482 || .352 || .828 || 7.7 || 1.8 || 1.4 || 1.0 || 14.8
|-
| style="text-align:left;"| 
| style="text-align:left;"| Dallas
| 75 || 75 || 33.3 || .450 || .167 || .822 || 8.0 || 1.6 || 1.0 || .7 || 14.2
|-
| style="text-align:left;"| 
| style="text-align:left;"| Dallas
| 78 || 77 || 36.7 || .464 || .184 || .833 || 8.8 || 1.6 || 1.0 || 1.2 || 15.0
|-
| style="text-align:left;"| 
| style="text-align:left;"| Dallas
| 76 || 70 || 35.1 || .493 || .214 || .778 || 7.5 || 2.3 || 1.2 || .8 || 15.9
|-
| style="text-align:left;"| 
| style="text-align:left;"| L.A. Lakers
| 76 || 66 || 34.3 || .495 || .281 || .821 || 7.4 || 1.5 || .9 || 1.1 || 13.5
|-
| style="text-align:left;"| 
| style="text-align:left;"| L.A. Lakers
| 63 || 63 || 37.0 || .450 || .217 || .817 || 8.8 || 2.2 || 1.0 || 1.0 || 16.5
|-
| style="text-align:left;"| 
| style="text-align:left;"| L.A. Lakers
| 49 || 49 || 32.4 || .459 || .172 || .829 || 7.7 || 2.6 || .8 || 1.0 || 13.7
|-
| style="text-align:left;"| 
| style="text-align:left;"| Seattle
| 30 || 13 || 25.4 || .511 || .452 || .795 || 4.8 || .9 || .7 || 1.0 || 12.1
|-
| style="text-align:left;"| 
| style="text-align:left;"| Seattle
| 81 || 41 || 26.8 || .438 || .367 || .801 || 4.5 || 1.4 || .8 || 4 || 12.3
|-
| style="text-align:left;"| 
| style="text-align:left;"| Seattle
| 82 || 37 || 28.7 || .466 || .397 || .799 || 4.9 || 1.6 || .9 || .5 || 12.7
|-
| style="text-align:left;"| 
| style="text-align:left;"| Seattle
| 82 || 20 || 26.5 || .408 || .355 || .793 || 4.5 || 1.5 || 1.0 || .6 || 11.8
|-
| style="text-align:left;"| 
| style="text-align:left;"| Seattle
| 81 || 4 || 24.4 || .439 || .395 || .817 || 3.7 || 1.3 || .9 || .6 || 11.0
|-
| style="text-align:left;"| 
| style="text-align:left;"| Seattle
| 81 || 0 || 20.7 || .416 || .392 || .789 || 3.1 || 1.4 || .8 || .4 || 7.2
|-
| style="text-align:left;"| 
| style="text-align:left;"| Indiana
| 48 || 0 || 16.4 || .400 || .389 || .717 || 2.9 || .5 || .3 || .3 || 5.0
|-
| style="text-align:left;"| 
| style="text-align:left;"| Indiana
| 81 || 0 || 20.0 || .417 || .408 || .825 || 3.6 || .8 || .4 || .4 || 6.6
|-
| style="text-align:left;"| 
| style="text-align:left;"| Indiana
| 64 || 41 || 15.6 || .381 || .345 || .842 || 2.6 || .6 || .5 || .3 || 3.8
|- class="sortbottom"
| style="text-align:center;" colspan="2"| Career
| 1,286 || 757 || 28.5 || .459 || .362 || .811 || 6.0 || 1.5 || .9 || .7 || 11.9

Playoffs 
Perkins has the distinction of having the third-most playoff games appeared in without having been on a team that won the NBA Championship. The only players with more playoff appearances and zero rings, as of the 2020 season, are Hall of Famers and longtime Utah Jazz players Karl Malone and John Stockton.

|-
| style="text-align:left;"| 1985
| style="text-align:left;"| Dallas
| 4 || 4 || 42.3 || .490 || .250 || .765 || 12.8 || 2.8 || .5 || .3 || 18.8
|-
| style="text-align:left;"| 1986
| style="text-align:left;"| Dallas
| 10 || 10 || 34.7 || .429 || .250 || .767 || 8.3 || 2.4 || .9 || 1.4 || 14.9
|-
| style="text-align:left;"| 1987
| style="text-align:left;"| Dallas
| 4 || 4 || 17.0 || .500 || .000 || .696 || 8.5 || 1.3 || 1.0 || .3 || 17.0
|-
| style="text-align:left;"| 1988
| style="text-align:left;"| Dallas
| 17 || 17 || 33.6 || .451 || .143 || .803 || 6.6 || 1.8 || 1.5 || 1.0 || 13.5
|-
| style="text-align:left;"| 1990
| style="text-align:left;"| Dallas
| 3 || 3 || 39.3 || .444 || .000 || .765 || 7.3 || 2.7 || 1.0 || .7 || 15.0
|-
| style="text-align:left;"| 1991
| style="text-align:left;"| L.A. Lakers
| 19 || 19 || 39.6 || .548 || .367 || .761 || 8.3 || 1.7 || .8 || 1.4 || 17.7
|-
| style="text-align:left;"| 1993
| style="text-align:left;"| Seattle
| 19 || 17 || 32.9 || .436 || .380 || .873 || 7.0 || 1.9 || 1.0 || 1.3 || 14.4
|-
| style="text-align:left;"| 1994
| style="text-align:left;"| Seattle
| 5 || 0 || 28.2 || .333 || .429 || .882 || 7.2 || .8 || .8 || .4 || 9.8
|-
| style="text-align:left;"| 1995
| style="text-align:left;"| Seattle
| 4 || 1 || 35.3 || .438 || .455 || 1.000 || 7.8 || 3.3 || .8 || 1.3 || 13.5
|-
| style="text-align:left;"| 1996
| style="text-align:left;"| Seattle
| 21 || 1 || 31.1 || .459 || .368 || .754 || 4.3 || 1.7 || .7 || .3 || 12.3
|-
| style="text-align:left;"| 1997
| style="text-align:left;"| Seattle
| 12 || 6 || 28.3 || .337 || .311 || .862 || 4.4 || 1.3 || 1.0 || 1.0 || 8.4
|-
| style="text-align:left;"| 1998
| style="text-align:left;"| Seattle
| 10 || 1 || 21.0 || .381 || .417 || .600 || 3.2 || 1.4 || .3 || .5 || 5.4
|-
| style="text-align:left;"| 1999
| style="text-align:left;"| Indiana
| 13 || 0 || 11.2 || .514 || .458 || .667 || 1.9 || .5 || .0 || .2 || 4.1
|-
| style="text-align:left;"| 2000
| style="text-align:left;"| Indiana
| 23 || 0 || 18.1 || .324 || .348 || .905 || 3.2 || .4 || .2 || .3 || 4.8
|-
| style="text-align:left;"| 2001
| style="text-align:left;"| Indiana
| 3 || 0 || 6.3 || .250 || .250 || – || 1.3 || .0 || .0 || .0 || 1.7
|- class="sortbottom"
| style="text-align:center;" colspan="2"| Career
| 167 || 83 || 28.7 || .444 || .363 || .785 || 5.6 || 1.5 || .7 || .8 || 11.1

See also 
List of NCAA Division I men's basketball players with 2,000 points and 1,000 rebounds
List of National Basketball Association career games played leaders

References

External links 

 NBA.com Player File
 Sam Perkins at Basketball-Reference.com

1961 births
Living people
20th-century African-American sportspeople
21st-century African-American people
African-American basketball players
All-American college men's basketball players
American Jehovah's Witnesses
American men's basketball players
Basketball players at the 1983 Pan American Games
Basketball players at the 1984 Summer Olympics
Basketball players from New York City
Centers (basketball)
Dallas Mavericks draft picks
Dallas Mavericks players
Indiana Pacers players
Los Angeles Lakers players
McDonald's High School All-Americans
Medalists at the 1983 Pan American Games
Medalists at the 1984 Summer Olympics
North Carolina Tar Heels men's basketball players
Olympic gold medalists for the United States in basketball
Pan American Games gold medalists for the United States
Pan American Games medalists in basketball
Parade High School All-Americans (boys' basketball)
Power forwards (basketball)
Samuel J. Tilden High School alumni
Seattle SuperSonics players
Sportspeople from Brooklyn
United States men's national basketball team players